The Montenegro women's national basketball team represents Montenegro in international women's basketball tournaments. The supervising body is the Basketball Federation of Montenegro.
The Montenegrin women's national team entered international competition in 2008, playing their first official match on 27 August, against Republic of Ireland in Bijelo Polje (68–56).
The Montenegrin women's team participated at the EuroBasket Women four times – 2011, 2013, 2015, and 2017 reaching the quarterfinals twice.

History

Period 2006–2015
At 2006, soon after Montenegrin independence, Basketball Association of Montenegro became a member of FIBA. Federation founded its national teams, and among them was Montenegro women's basketball selection, which started to play in FIBA competitions during the 2008.
Montenegro started with the record of 17 consecutive wins in official games.
At summer 2008 and 2009, Montenegrin team played in FIBA Division B with the final score of 12 victories without any lose. That means fast promotion to FIBA Division A and participation in EuroBasket Women 2011 qualification.
In their first qualifiers, Montenegro qualified for EuroBasket Women 2011 as a first-placed team in the group. On EuroBasket, the team made successful result and played in quarterfinals. At the end, Montenegro finished as a sixth-placed team, which is the best placement in history of Montenegrin women's basketball.
After new successful qualifiers, Montenegro played on EuroBasket Women 2013, but finished competition in the second phase, with final placement on 10th position.
For the third time, Montenegro played on EuroBasket at 2015. Like 2011, Montenegro played in the quarterfinals but lost against Spain with one point difference. Montenegro finished EuroBasket 2015 as seventh-placed team.

Period 2016–
Montenegro made another successful result in qualifiers for EuroBasket Women 2017. With score 4–2, the team qualified for European Championship, fourth in their history. At the championship finals, Montenegrin team disappointed with 3 losses and elimination on early stage of tournament.
Just like in previous campaigns, Montenegrin national team won the Group A in EuroBasket Women 2019 qualifiers and gained their fifth performance on European Championship.

Competitive record
Montenegro was part of Yugoslavia until 2006.

Olympic Games

FIBA Women's World Cup

EuroBasket Women

Team

Current roster
Roster for the EuroBasket Women 2021.

Head coaches
Since its foundation, Montenegro women's national basketball team had four head coaches.
In the period 2008–2013, head coach of Montenegro was Miodrag Baletić. From 2014, Montenegrin team was led by Momir Milatović, who was head coach during three years. In 2017, first foreigner was promoted as head coach of Montenegrin team. That was Roberto Íñiguez, whose mandate lasted until the beginning of 2019.
In January 2019, Basketball Association of Montenegro stated that new head coach of national team is former player and captain Jelena Škerović. She became a first woman to be a head coach of any Montenegrin national A team.

Statistics and games

List of official matches

Montenengro played its first official match in August 2008. There is a List of official matches of the Montenegro women's national basketball team played since independence.

Opponents
Below is the list of performances of Montenegro national basketball team against every single opponent.

Last update: 22 September 2019.

Kit

Manufacturer
 2008–2011: Kappa
 2011–present: Peak

Sponsor
 2008–2011: VOLI
 2012–2014: diva
 2014–2015: EPCG
 2015–present: m:tel

See also
List of official matches of the Montenegro women's national basketball team
Sport in Montenegro
First А Women's Basketball League of Montenegro
Montenegro national basketball team

References

External links
 
FIBA profile

 
 
Women's national basketball teams
2006 establishments in Montenegro